Tiszafüred Városi Sportegyesület is a professional football club based in Tiszafüred, Jász-Nagykun-Szolnok County, Hungary, that competes in the Nemzeti Bajnokság III, the third tier of Hungarian football.

History
Tiszafüred VSE is going to compete in the 2017–18 Nemzeti Bajnokság III.

Name changes
Tiszafüredi TC: ? – ?
Tiszafüredi CIKTA: ? – ?
Tiszafüredi Barátság SE: 1946 – 1947
Tiszafüredi DSE: 1947 – 1951
Tiszafüredi Petőfi SK: 1951 – ?
Tiszafüredi Bástya SK: ? – 1957?
Tiszafüredi Petőfi SK: 1957? -?
Tiszafüredi Spartacus: ? – ?
Tiszafüredi Vasas Szövetkezeti SE: ? – ?
Tiszafüredi VSE Ivecosped City Gas: ? – ?
Tiszafüredi Városi Sportegyesület ? - 2022
Facultas Tiszafüredi VSE 2022 -

Honours
Jász-Nagykun-Szolnok:
Winner (1): 2016–17

Season results
As of 6 August 2017

External links
 Profile on Magyar Futball

References

Football clubs in Hungary
Association football clubs established in 1913
1913 establishments in Hungary